Gyem may be,

Gyem language
Gyem Dorji
Gyem - an elfin spirit